was a samurai of the Uesugi clan, Kantō Kanrei and shugo (Constable) of Kōzuke and Musashi Province. His loss of the Izu Province to Hōjō Sōun in 1492–1498 marked a significant development of Japan's Sengoku period.

Nagao Tamekage, rose up against him in 1510 with the help of Hōjō Sōun, seizing the province and killing Akisada. Sōun, with Tamekage's help, would go on to conquer some of Sagami Province, and become one of the most major figures of the Sengoku period.

Tamekage's son Uesugi Kenshin would likewise become a major warlord of the period, his rise with the Kantō as the center of his power base, as the result of Akisada's loss, a crucial element to his success.

See also
 Uesugi clan

References

Further reading
Sansom, George (1961). "A History of Japan: 1334–1615." Stanford, California: Stanford University Press.
Turnbull, Stephen (1998). 'The Samurai Sourcebook'. London: Cassell & Co.

1454 births
1510 deaths
Uesugi clan